Las Rozas Black Demons is an American football team based in Las Rozas, Spain.

The team compete in LNFA Serie A, the first-tier division of American football in Spain.

External links
Official website

American football teams established in 2000
2000 establishments in Spain
American football teams in Spain
Sports teams in the Community of Madrid